Barbara Wayne Abraham-Shrauner is an American physicist, applied mathematician, and electrical engineer, known for her research on magnetohydrodynamics and plasma phenomena, including mathematical modeling of shocks and Alfvén waves, observation of the solar wind, and applications to the plasma etching of semiconductors, as well as on hidden symmetries and nonlocal symmetries in differential equations. She is retired as a professor of electrical and systems engineering at Washington University in St. Louis.

Education and career
Abraham-Shrauner graduated from the University of Colorado in 1956.
She earned a master's degree from Harvard University in 1957 and completed her Ph.D. there in 1962.

She joined Washington University in St. Louis faculty in 1966, after postdoctoral research at the Université libre de Bruxelles and NASA Ames Research Center, and retired from full-time service in 2003 at Washington University, where she continues to hold an affiliation as a part-time Senior Professor in the Department of Electrical and Systems Engineering.

Recognition
Abraham-Shrauner was named a Fellow of the American Physical Society (APS) in 1999, after a nomination from the APS Division of Plasma Physics, "for important theoretical contributions to a broad range of plasma topics, including: space plasmas, nonlinear dynamics, and plasma processing".

Personal life
Abraham-Shrauner was married to James Ely Shrauner (1933–2015), a professor of physics at Washington University.

References

Year of birth missing (living people)
Living people
American physicists
20th-century American mathematicians
21st-century American mathematicians
American women mathematicians
American women physicists
Applied mathematicians
American electrical engineers
American women engineers
University of Colorado alumni
Washington University in St. Louis faculty
Fellows of the American Physical Society
Washington University physicists
21st-century American women
Harvard School of Engineering and Applied Sciences alumni